SS Wesley W. Barrett was a Liberty ship built in the United States during World War II. She was named after Wesley W. Barrett.

Construction
Wesley W. Barrett was laid down on 29 January 1945, under a Maritime Commission (MARCOM) contract, MC hull 2342, by J.A. Jones Construction, Panama City, Florida; she was launched on 7 March 1945.

History
She was allocated to American West African Line Inc., on 21 March 1945. After a number of contracts, on 18 September 1947, she was laid up in the Beaumont Reserve Fleet, Beaumont, Texas. She was sold for scrapping, 22 September 1964, to Pinto Island Metals Co., for $49,666.88. She was withdrawn from the fleet, 8 February 1965.

References

Bibliography

 
 
 
 

 

Liberty ships
Ships built in Panama City, Florida
1945 ships
Beaumont Reserve Fleet